Properigea is a genus of moths of the family Noctuidae. The genus was erected by William Barnes and Foster Hendrickson Benjamin in 1926.

Species
 Properigea albimacula (Barnes & McDunnough, 1912)
 Properigea continens (H. Edwards, 1885)
 Properigea costa (Barnes & Benjamin, 1923)
 Properigea loculosa (Grote, 1881)
 Properigea mephisto (Blanchard, 1968)
 Properigea niveirena (Harvey, 1876)
 Properigea perolivalis (Barnes & McDunnough, 1912)
 Properigea seitzi (Barnes & Benjamin, 1926)
 Properigea suffusa (Barnes & McDunnough, 1912)
 Properigea tapeta (Smith, 1900)

References

Cuculliinae